This list of birds of Saskatchewan includes all the bird species confirmed in the Canadian province of Saskatchewan as determined by Nature Saskatchewan. As of September 2017, there were 436 species on the Nature Saskatchewan checklist. Of these species, 86 are considered stragglers and 43 are hypothetical; both terms are defined below. Ten species have been introduced to Saskatchewan or elsewhere in North America. One species is extinct, two have been extirpated, and another might be extinct.

This list is presented in the taxonomic sequence of the Check-list of North and Middle American Birds, 7th edition through the 62nd Supplement, published by the American Ornithological Society (AOS). Common and scientific names are also those of the Check-list, except that Canadian English spellings are used and the common names of families are from the Clements taxonomy because the AOS list does not include them..

The following tags are used to describe some categories of occurrence.

(S) Straggler - species with 30 or fewer records per Nature Saskatchewan
(H) Hypothetical - species lacking a specimen, photograph, or sound recording per Nature Saskatchewan; these also are "stragglers" but are not marked as such
(I) Introduced - established solely as result of human intervention, either directly in Saskatchewan or elsewhere in North America

Ducks, geese, and waterfowl
Order: AnseriformesFamily: Anatidae

The family Anatidae includes ducks and most duck-like waterfowl, such as geese and swans. These birds are adapted to an aquatic existence with webbed feet, bills which are flattened to a greater or lesser extent, and feathers that are excellent at shedding water due to special oils.

Emperor goose, Anser canagica (H)
Snow goose, Anser caerulescens
Ross's goose, Anser rossii
Greater white-fronted goose, Anser albifrons
Tundra bean-goose, Anser serrirostris (S)
Bar-headed goose, Anser indicus (H) (Not on the AOS Check-list)
Brant, Branta bernicla (S)
Barnacle goose, Branta leucopsis (H)
Cackling goose, Branta hutchinsii
Canada goose, Branta canadensis
Mute swan, Cygnus olor (I) (Extirpated)
Trumpeter swan, Cygnus buccinator
Tundra swan, Cygnus columbianus
Wood duck, Aix sponsa
Garganey, Spatula querquedula (S)
Blue-winged teal, Spatula discors
Cinnamon teal, Spatula cyanoptera
Northern shoveler, Spatula clypeata
Gadwall, Mareca strepera
Eurasian wigeon, Mareca penelope (S)
American wigeon, Mareca americana
Mallard, Anas fulvigula
American black duck, Anas rubripes
Northern pintail, Anas bahamensis
Green-winged teal, Anas crecca
Canvasback, Aythya valisineria
Redhead, Aythya americana
Common pochard, Aythya ferina (H)
Ring-necked duck, Aythya collaris
Tufted duck, Aythya fuligula (H)
Greater scaup, Aythya marila
Lesser scaup, Aythya affinis
King eider, Somateria spectabilis (S)
Common eider, Somateria mollissima (S)
Harlequin duck, Histrionicus histrionicus (S)
Surf scoter, Melanitta perspicillata
White-winged scoter, Melanitta deglandi
Black scoter, Melanitta americana
Long-tailed duck, Clangula hyemalis
Bufflehead, Bucephala albeola
Common goldeneye, Bucephala clangula
Barrow's goldeneye, Bucephala islandica
Hooded merganser, Lophodytes cucullatus
Common merganser, Mergus merganser
Red-breasted merganser, Mergus serrator
Ruddy duck, Oxyura jamaicensis

Pheasants, grouse, and allies
Order: GalliformesFamily: Phasianidae

The Phasianidae is a family of birds which consists of pheasants, partridges, grouse, turkeys, and their allies. These are terrestrial species, variable in size but generally plump with broad relatively short wings. Many species are gamebirds or have been domesticated as a food source for humans.

Wild turkey, Meleagris gallopavo (I)
Ruffed grouse, Bonasa umbellus
Greater sage-grouse, Centrocercus urophasianus
Spruce grouse, Canachites canadensis
Willow ptarmigan, Lagopus lagopus
Rock ptarmigan, Lagopus muta (S)
Sharp-tailed grouse, Tympanuchus phasianellus
Greater prairie-chicken, Tympanuchus cupido (Extirpated)
Grey partridge, Perdix perdix (I)
Ring-necked pheasant, Phasianus colchicus (I)

Grebes
Order: PodicipediformesFamily: Podicipedidae

Grebes small to medium-large freshwater diving birds. They have lobed toes and are excellent swimmers and divers. However, they have their feet placed far back on the body, making them quite ungainly on land.

Pied-billed grebe, Podilymbus podiceps
Horned grebe, Podiceps auritus
Red-necked grebe, Podiceps grisegena
Eared grebe, Podiceps nigricollis
Western grebe, Aechmorphorus occidentalis
Clark's grebe, Aechmorphorus clarkii

Pigeons and doves
Order: ColumbiformesFamily: Columbidae

Pigeons and doves are stout-bodied birds with short necks and short slender bills with a fleshy cere.

Rock pigeon, Columba livia (I)
Band-tailed pigeon, Patagioenas fasciata (S)
Eurasian collared-dove, Streptopelia decaocto (I)
Passenger pigeon, Ectopistes migratorius (Extinct)
White-winged dove, Zenaida asiatica (S)
Mourning dove, Zenaida macroura

Cuckoos
Order: CuculiformesFamily: Cuculidae

The family Cuculidae includes cuckoos, roadrunners, and anis. These birds are of variable size with slender bodies, long tails, and strong legs.

Yellow-billed cuckoo, Coccyzus americanus (S)
Black-billed cuckoo, Coccyzus erythropthalmus

Nightjars and allies
Order: CaprimulgiformesFamily: Caprimulgidae

Nightjars are medium-sized ground-nesting nocturnal birds with long wings, short legs, and very short bills. Most have small feet, of little use for walking, and long pointed wings. Their soft plumage is camouflaged to resemble bark or leaves.

Common nighthawk,  Chordeiles minor
Common poorwill,  Phalaenoptilus nuttallii
Eastern whip-poor-will, Antrostomus vociferus

Swifts
Order: ApodiformesFamily: Apodidae

Swifts are small birds which spend the majority of their lives flying. These birds have very short legs and never settle voluntarily on the ground, perching instead only on vertical surfaces. Many swifts have long swept-back wings which resemble a crescent or boomerang.

Black swift, Cypseloides niger (H)
Chimney swift, Chaetura pelagica

Hummingbirds
Order: ApodiformesFamily: Trochilidae

Hummingbirds are small birds capable of hovering in mid-air due to the rapid flapping of their wings. They are the only birds that can fly backward.

Ruby-throated hummingbird, Archilochus colubris
Black-chinned hummingbird, Archilochus alexandri (H)
Anna's hummingbird, Calypte anna (S)
Calliope hummingbird, Selasphorus calliope (S)
Rufous hummingbird, Selasphorus rufus (S)

Rails, gallinules, and coots
Order: GruiformesFamily: Rallidae

Rallidae is a large family of small to medium-sized birds which includes the rails, crakes gallinules, and coots. The most typical family members occupy dense vegetation in damp environments near lakes, swamps, or rivers. In general, they are shy and secretive birds, making them difficult to observe. Most species have strong legs and long toes which are well adapted to soft uneven surfaces. They tend to have short, rounded wings and to be weak fliers.

Virginia rail, Rallus limicola
Sora, Porzana carolina
American coot, Fulica americana
Yellow rail, Coturnicops noveboracensis
Black rail, Laterallus jamaicensis (H)

Cranes
Order: GruiformesFamily: Gruidae

Cranes are large, long-legged, and long-necked birds. Unlike the similar-looking but unrelated herons, cranes fly with necks outstretched, not pulled back. Most have elaborate and noisy courting displays or "dances".

Sandhill crane, Antigone canadensis
Common crane, Grus grus (S)
Whooping crane, Grus americana

Stilts and avocets
Order: CharadriiformesFamily: Recurvirostridae

Recurvirostridae is a family of large wading birds, which includes the avocets and stilts. The avocets have long legs and long up-curved bills. The stilts have extremely long legs and long, thin, straight bills.

Black-necked stilt, Himantopus mexicanus
American avocet, Recurvirostra americana

Plovers and lapwings
Order: CharadriiformesFamily: Charadriidae

Charadriidae includes the plovers, dotterels, and lapwings. They are small to medium-sized birds with compact bodies, short thick necks, and long, usually pointed, wings. They are found in open country worldwide, mostly in habitats near water.

Black-bellied plover, Pluvialis squatarola
American golden-plover, Pluvialis dominica
Pacific golden-plover, Pluvialis fulva (H)
Killdeer, Charadrius vociferus
Semipalmated plover, Charadrius semipalmatus
Piping plover, Charadrius melodus
Snowy plover, Charadrius nivosus (S)
Mountain plover, Charadrius montanus (S)

Sandpipers and allies
Order: CharadriiformesFamily: Scolopacidae

Scolopacidae is a large diverse family of small to medium-sized shorebirds including the sandpipers, curlews, godwits, shanks, tattlers, woodcocks, snipes, dowitchers, and phalaropes. The majority of these species eat small invertebrates picked out of the mud or soil. Variation in length of legs and bills enables multiple species to feed in the same habitat, particularly on the coast, without direct competition for food.

Upland sandpiper, Bartramia longicauda
Whimbrel, Numenius phaeopus
Eskimo curlew, Numenius borealis (H) (Possibly extinct)
Long-billed curlew, Numenius americanus
Bar-tailed godwit, Limosa lapponica (S)
Hudsonian godwit, Limosa haemastica
Marbled godwit, Limosa fedoa
Ruddy turnstone, Arenaria interpres
Red knot, Calidris canutus
Surfbird, Calidris virgata (H)
Ruff, Calidris pugnax (S)
Sharp-tailed sandpiper, Calidris acuminata (H)
Stilt sandpiper, Calidris himantopus
Curlew sandpiper, Calidris ferruginea (H)
Red-necked stint, Calidris ruficollis (H)
Sanderling, Calidris alba
Dunlin, Calidris alpina
Rock sandpiper, Calidris ptilocnemis (H)
Baird's sandpiper, Calidris bairdii
Least sandpiper, Calidris minutilla
White-rumped sandpiper, Calidris fuscicollis
Buff-breasted sandpiper, Calidris subruficollis
Pectoral sandpiper, Calidris melanotos
Semipalmated sandpiper, Calidris pusilla
Western sandpiper, Calidris mauri (S)
Short-billed dowitcher, Limnodromus griseus
Long-billed dowitcher, Limnodromus scolopaceus
American woodcock, Scolopax minor (S)
Wilson's snipe, Gallinago delicata
Spotted sandpiper, Actitis macularia
Solitary sandpiper, Tringa solitaria
Lesser yellowlegs, Tringa flavipes
Willet, Tringa semipalmata
Spotted redshank, Tringa erythropus (S)
Greater yellowlegs, Tringa melanoleuca
Wilson's phalarope, Phalaropus tricolor
Red-necked phalarope, Phalaropus lobatus
Red phalarope, Phalaropus fulicarius (S)

Skuas and jaegers
Order: CharadriiformesFamily: Stercorariidae

The family Stercorariidae are large birds, typically with grey or brown plumage, often with white markings on the wings. They have longish bills with hooked tips and webbed feet with sharp claws. They look like large dark gulls, but have a fleshy cere above the upper mandible. They are strong, acrobatic fliers.

Pomarine jaeger, Stercorarius pomarinus (S)
Parasitic jaeger, Stercorarius parasiticus
Long-tailed jaeger, Stercorarius longicaudus (S)

Auks, murres, and puffins
Order: CharadriiformesFamily: Alcidae

Alcids are superficially similar to penguins due to their black-and-white colours, their upright posture, and some of their habits. However, they are only distantly related to the penguins and are able to fly. Auks live on the open sea, only deliberately coming ashore to nest.
 
Black guillemot, Cepphus grylle (S)
Pigeon guillemot, Cepphus columba (H)
Long-billed murrelet, Brachyramphus perdix (H)
Ancient murrelet, Synthliboramphus antiquus (S)

Gulls, terns, and skimmers
Order: CharadriiformesFamily: Laridae

Laridae is a family of medium to large seabirds and includes gulls, terns, kittiwakes, and skimmers. They are typically grey or white, often with black markings on the head or wings. They have stout, longish bills and webbed feet.

Black-legged kittiwake, Rissa tridactyla (S)
Ivory gull, Pagophila eburnea (H)
Sabine's gull, Xema sabini (S)
Bonaparte's gull, Chroicocephalus philadelphia
Little gull, Hydrocoloeus minutus (S)
Ross's gull, Rhodostethia rosea (S)
Laughing gull, Leucophaeus atricilla (H)
Franklin's gull, Leucophaeus pipixcan
Short-billed gull,Larus brachyrhynchus
Ring-billed gull, Larus delawarensis
Western gull, Larus occidentalis (S)
California gull, Larus californicus
Herring gull, Larus argentatus
Iceland gull, Larus glaucoides
Lesser black-backed gull, Larus fuscus (S)
Slaty-backed gull, Larus schistisagus (S)
Glaucous-winged gull, Larus glaucescens (H)
Glaucous gull, Larus hyperboreus
Great black-backed gull, Larus marinus (S)
Least tern, Sternula antillarum (S)
Caspian tern, Hydroprogne caspia
Black tern, Chlidonias niger
Common tern, Sterna hirundo
Arctic tern, Sterna paradisaea
Forster's tern, Sterna forsteri

Loons
Order: GaviiformesFamily: Gaviidae

Loons, known as divers in Europe, are aquatic birds the size of a large duck, to which they are unrelated. Their plumage is largely grey or black, and they have spear-shaped bills. Loons swim well and fly adequately, but, because their legs are placed towards the rear of the body, are almost helpless on land.

Red-throated loon, Gavia stellata
Pacific loon, Gavia pacifica
Common loon, Gavia immer
Yellow-billed loon, Gavia adamsii (S)

Frigatebirds
Order: SuliformesFamily: Fregatidae

Frigatebirds are large seabirds usually found over tropical oceans. They are large, black, or black-and-white, with long wings and deeply forked tails. The males have coloured inflatable throat pouches. They do not swim or walk and cannot take off from a flat surface. Having the largest wingspan-to-body-weight ratio of any bird, they are essentially aerial, able to stay aloft for more than a week.

Magnificent frigatebird, Fregata magnificens (S)

Cormorants and shags
Order: SuliformesFamily: Phalacrocoracidae

Cormorants are medium-to-large aquatic birds, usually with mainly dark plumage and areas of coloured skin on the face. The bill is long, thin and sharply hooked. Their feet are four-toed and webbed.

Double-crested cormorant, Nannopterum auritum

Pelicans
Order: PelecaniformesFamily: Pelecanidae

Pelicans are very large water birds with a distinctive pouch under their beak. Like other birds in the order Pelecaniformes, they have four webbed toes.

American white pelican, Pelecanus erythrorhynchos

Herons, egrets, and bitterns
Order: PelecaniformesFamily: Ardeidae

The family Ardeidae contains the bitterns, herons, and egrets. Herons and egrets are medium to large wading birds with long necks and legs. Bitterns tend to be shorter necked and warier. Unlike other long-necked birds such as storks, ibises, and spoonbills, members of this family fly with their necks retracted.

American bittern, Botaurus lentiginosus
Least bittern, Ixobrychus exilis (S)
Great blue heron, Ardea herodias
Great egret, Ardea alba
Snowy egret, Egretta thula (S)
Little blue heron, Egretta caerulea (S)
Tricolored heron, Egretta tricolor (S)
Cattle egret, Bubulcus ibis
Green heron, Butorides virescens (S)
Black-crowned night-heron, Nycticorax nycticorax
Yellow-crowned night-heron, Nyctanassa violacea (S)

Ibises and spoonbills
Order: PelecaniformesFamily: Threskiornithidae

Threskiornithidae is a family of large terrestrial and wading birds which comprises the ibises and spoonbills. Its members have long, broad wings with 11 primary and about 20 secondary flight feathers. They are strong fliers and, despite their size and weight, very capable soarers.

Glossy ibis, Plegadis falcinellus (H)
White-faced ibis, Plegadis chihi

New World vultures
Order: CathartiformesFamily: Cathartidae

The New World vultures are not closely related to Old World vultures, but superficially resemble them because of convergent evolution. Like the Old World vultures, they are scavengers. However, unlike Old World vultures, which find carcasses by sight, New World vultures have a good sense of smell with which they locate carcasses.

Black vulture, Coragyps atratus (H)
Turkey vulture, Cathartes aura

Osprey
Order: AccipitriformesFamily: Pandionidae

Pandionidae is a family of fish-eating birds of prey possessing a very large, powerful hooked beak for tearing flesh from their prey, strong legs, powerful talons, and keen eyesight. The family is monotypic.

Osprey, Pandion haliaetus

Hawks, eagles, and kites
Order: AccipitriformesFamily: Accipitridae

The Accipitridae is a family of birds of prey which includes hawks, eagles, kites, harriers, and Old World vultures. These birds mostly have powerful hooked beaks for tearing flesh from their prey, strong legs, powerful talons, and keen eyesight.

White-tailed kite, Elanus leucurus (S)
Swallow-tailed kite, Elanoides forficatus (H)
Golden eagle, Aquila chrysaetos
Northern harrier, Circus hudsonius
Sharp-shinned hawk, Accipiter striatus
Cooper's hawk, Accipiter cooperii
Northern goshawk, Accipiter gentilis
Bald eagle, Haliaeetus leucocephalus
Mississippi kite, Ictinia mississippiensis (S)
Red-shouldered hawk, Buteo lineatus (H)
Broad-winged hawk, Buteo platypterus
Swainson's hawk, Buteo swainsoni
Red-tailed hawk, Buteo jamaicensis
Rough-legged hawk, Buteo lagopus
Ferruginous hawk, Buteo regalis

Barn-owls
Order: StrigiformesFamily: Tytonidae

Barn-owls are medium to large owls with large heads and characteristic heart-shaped faces. They have long strong legs with powerful talons.

Barn owl, Tyto alba (S)

Owls
Order: StrigiformesFamily: Strigidae

The typical owls are small to large solitary nocturnal birds of prey. They have large forward-facing eyes and ears, a hawk-like beak, and a conspicuous circle of feathers around each eye called a facial disk.

Western screech-owl, Megascops kennicottii (H)
Eastern screech-owl, Megascops asio
Great horned owl, Bubo virginianus
Snowy owl, Bubo scandiacus
Northern hawk owl, Surnia ulula
Northern pygmy-owl, Glaucidium gnoma (S)
Burrowing owl, Athene cunicularia
Barred owl, Strix varia
Great grey owl, Strix nebulosa
Long-eared owl, Asio otus
Short-eared owl, Asio flammeus
Boreal owl, Aegolius funereus
Northern saw-whet owl, Aegolius acadicus

Kingfishers
Order: CoraciiformesFamily: Alcedinidae

Kingfishers are medium-sized birds with large heads, long pointed bills, short legs, and stubby tails.

Belted kingfisher, Megaceryle alcyon

Woodpeckers
Order: PiciformesFamily: Picidae

Woodpeckers, sapsuckers, and flickers are small to medium-sized birds with chisel-like beaks, short legs, stiff tails, and long tongues used for capturing insects. Some species have feet with two toes pointing forward and two backward, while several species have only three toes. Many woodpeckers have the habit of tapping noisily on tree trunks with their beaks.

Lewis's woodpecker, Melanerpes lewis (S)
Red-headed woodpecker, Melanerpes erythrocephalus
Red-bellied woodpecker, Melanerpes carolinus (S)
Williamson's sapsucker, Sphyrapicus thyroideus (S)
Yellow-bellied sapsucker, Sphyrapicus varius
Red-naped sapsucker, Sphyrapicus nuchalis
American three-toed woodpecker, Picoides dorsalis
Black-backed woodpecker, Picoides arcticus
Downy woodpecker, Dryobates pubescens
Hairy woodpecker, Dryobates villosus
Northern flicker, Colaptes auratus
Pileated woodpecker, Dryocopus pileatus

Falcons and caracaras
Order: FalconiformesFamily: Falconidae

Falconidae is a family of diurnal birds of prey, notably the falcons and caracaras. They differ from hawks, eagles, and kites in that they kill with their beaks instead of their talons.

Crested caracara, Caracara plancus (S)
American kestrel, Falco sparverius
Merlin, Falco columbarius
Gyrfalcon, Falco rusticolus
Peregrine falcon, Falco peregrinus
Prairie falcon, Falco mexicanus

Tyrant flycatchers
Order: PasseriformesFamily: Tyrannidae

Tyrant flycatchers are Passerine birds which occur throughout North and South America. They superficially resemble the Old World flycatchers, but are more robust and have stronger bills. They do not have the sophisticated vocal capabilities of the songbirds. Most are rather plain. As the name implies, most are insectivorous.

Great crested flycatcher, Myiarchus crinitus
Tropical kingbird, Tyrannus melancholicus (S)
Western kingbird, Tyrannus verticalis
Eastern kingbird, Tyrannus tyrannus
Scissor-tailed flycatcher, Tyrannus forficatus (S)
Fork-tailed flycatcher, Tyrannus savana (H)
Olive-sided flycatcher, Contopus cooperi
Western wood-pewee, Contopus sordidulus
Eastern wood-pewee, Contopus virens
Yellow-bellied flycatcher, Empidonax flaviventris
Alder flycatcher, Empidonax alnorum
Willow flycatcher, Empidonax traillii
Least flycatcher, Empidonax minimus
Grey flycatcher, Empidonax wrightii (H)
Dusky flycatcher, Empidonax oberholseri
Cordilleran flycatcher, Empidonax occidentalis (S)
Eastern phoebe, Sayornis phoebe
Say's phoebe, Sayornis saya

Vireos, shrike-babblers, and erpornis
Order: PasseriformesFamily: Vireonidae

The vireos are a group of small to medium-sized passerine birds. They are typically greenish in colour and resemble wood-warblers apart from their heavier bills.

White-eyed vireo, Vireo griseus (S)
Yellow-throated vireo, Vireo flavifrons
Cassin's vireo, Vireo cassinii (S)
Blue-headed vireo, Vireo solitarius
Plumbeous vireo, Vireo plumbeus (H)
Philadelphia vireo, Vireo philadelphicus
Warbling vireo, Vireo gilvus
Red-eyed vireo, Vireo olivaceus

Shrikes
Order: PasseriformesFamily: Laniidae

Shrikes are passerine birds known for the habit of catching other birds and small animals and impaling the uneaten portions of their bodies on thorns. A shrike's beak is hooked, like that of a typical bird of prey.

Loggerhead shrike, Lanius ludovicianus
Northern shrike, Lanius borealis

Crows, jays, and magpies
Order: PasseriformesFamily: Corvidae

The family Corvidae includes crows, ravens, jays, choughs, magpies, treepies, nutcrackers, and ground jays. Corvids are above average in size among the Passeriformes, and some of the larger species show high levels of intelligence.

Canada jay, Perisoreus canadensis
Pinyon jay, Gymnorhinus cyanocephalus (H)
Steller's jay, Cyanocitta stelleri (S)
Blue jay, Cyanocitta cristata
Clark's nutcracker, Nucifraga columbiana (S)
Black-billed magpie, Pica hudsonia
American crow, Corvus brachyrhynchos
Common raven, Corvus corax

Tits, chickadees, and titmice
Order: PasseriformesFamily: Paridae

Chickadees and titmice are mainly small stocky woodland species with short stout bills. Some have crests. They are adaptable birds, with a mixed diet including seeds and insects.

Black-capped chickadee, Poecile atricapilla
Mountain chickadee, Poecile gambeli (S)
Boreal chickadee, Poecile hudsonica
Bridled titmouse, Baeolophus wollweberi (H)
Tufted titmouse, Baeolophus bicolor (H)

Larks
Order: PasseriformesFamily: Alaudidae

Larks are small terrestrial birds with often extravagant songs and display flights. Most larks are fairly dull in appearance. Their food is insects and seeds.

Horned lark, Eremophila alpestris

Swallows
Order: PasseriformesFamily: Hirundinidae

The family Hirundinidae is a group of passerines characterised by their adaptation to aerial feeding. These adaptations include a slender streamlined body, long pointed wings, and short bills with a wide gape. The feet are adapted to perching rather than walking, and the front toes are partially joined at the base.

Bank swallow, Riparia riparia
Tree swallow, Tachycineta bicolor
Violet-green swallow, Tachycineta thalassina (A)
Northern rough-winged swallow, Stelgidopteryx serripennis
Purple martin, Progne subis
Barn swallow, Hirundo rustica
Cliff swallow, Petrochelidon pyrrhonota

Kinglets
Order: PasseriformesFamily: Regulidae

The kinglets are a small family of birds which resemble the titmice. They are very small insectivorous birds. The adults have coloured crowns, giving rise to their name.

Ruby-crowned kinglet, Corthylio calendula
Golden-crowned kinglet, Regulus satrapa

Waxwings
Order: PasseriformesFamily: Bombycillidae

The waxwings are a group of birds with soft silky plumage and unique red tips to some of the wing feathers. In the Bohemian and cedar waxwings, these tips look like sealing wax and give the group its name. These are arboreal birds of northern forests.

Bohemian waxwing, Bombycilla garrulus
Cedar waxwing, Bombycilla cedrorum

Nuthatches
Order: PasseriformesFamily: Sittidae

Nuthatches are small woodland birds. They have the unusual ability to climb down trees head first, unlike other birds which can only go upwards. Nuthatches have big heads, short tails, and powerful bills and feet.

Red-breasted nuthatch, Sitta canadensis
White-breasted nuthatch, Sitta carolinensis
Pygmy nuthatch, Sitta pygmaea (H)

Treecreepers
Order: PasseriformesFamily: Certhiidae

Treecreepers are small woodland birds, brown above and white below. They have thin pointed down-curved bills, which they use to extricate insects from bark. They have stiff tail feathers, like woodpeckers, which they use to support themselves on vertical trees.

Brown creeper, Certhia americana

Gnatcatchers
Order: PasseriformesFamily: Polioptilidae

Gnatcatchers are a group of small insectivorous passerine birds. Most are of generally undistinguished appearance, but many have distinctive songs.

Blue-grey gnatcatcher, Polioptila caerulea (S)

Wrens
Order: PasseriformesFamily: Troglodytidae

Wrens are small and inconspicuous birds, except for their loud songs. They have short wings and thin down-turned bills. Several species often hold their tails upright. All are insectivorous.

Rock wren, Salpinctes obsoletus
Canyon wren, Catherpes mexicanus (H)
House wren, Troglodytes aedon
Pacific wren, Troglodytes pacificus (S)
Winter wren, Troglodytes hiemalis
Sedge wren, Cistothorus platensis
Marsh wren, Cistothorus palustris
Carolina wren, Thryothorus ludovicianus (H)
Cactus wren, Campylorhynchus brunneicapillus (H)

Mockingbirds and thrashers
Order: PasseriformesFamily: Mimidae

The mimids are a family of passerine birds that includes thrashers, mockingbirds, tremblers, and the New World catbirds. These birds are notable for their vocalization, especially their remarkable ability to mimic a wide variety of birds and other sounds heard outdoors. The species tend towards dull greys and browns in their appearance.

Grey catbird, Dumetella carolinensis
Curve-billed thrasher, Toxostoma curvirostre (S)
Brown thrasher, Toxostoma rufum
Bendire's thrasher, Toxostoma bendirei (H)
Sage thrasher, Oreoscoptes montanus (S)
Northern mockingbird, Mimus polyglottos

Starlings
Order: PasseriformesFamily: Sturnidae

Starlings are small to medium-sized passerine birds. Their flight is strong and direct and they are very gregarious. Their preferred habitat is fairly open country. They eat insects and fruit. Plumage is typically dark with a metallic sheen.

European starling, Sturnus vulgaris (I)

Dippers
Order: PasseriformesFamily: Cinclidae

Dippers are a group of perching birds whose habitat includes aquatic environments in the Americas, Europe, and Asia. They are named for their bobbing or dipping movements. These birds have adaptations which allows them to submerge and walk on the bottom to feed on insect larvae.

American dipper, Cinclus mexicanus (S)

Thrushes and allies
Order: PasseriformesFamily: Turdidae

The thrushes are a group of passerine birds that occur mainly in the Old World. They are plump, soft plumaged, small to medium-sized insectivores or sometimes omnivores, often feeding on the ground. Many have attractive songs.

Eastern bluebird, Sialia sialis
Western bluebird, Sialia mexicana (H)
Mountain bluebird, Sialia currucoides
Townsend's solitaire, Myadestes townsendi
Veery, Catharus fuscescens
Grey-cheeked thrush, Catharus minimus
Swainson's thrush, Catharus ustulatus
Hermit thrush, Catharus guttatus
Wood thrush, Hylocichla mustelina (S)
Fieldfare, Turdus pilaris (S)
American robin, Turdus migratorius
Varied thrush, Ixoreus naevius

Old World flycatchers
Order: PasseriformesFamily: Muscicapidae

The Old World flycatchers are a large family of small passerine birds. These are mainly small arboreal insectivores, many of which, as the name implies, take their prey on the wing.

Northern wheatear, Oenanthe oenanthe (S)

Silky-flycatchers 
Order: PasseriformesFamily: Ptiliogonatidae

The silky-flycatchers are a small family of passerine birds which occur mainly in Central America. They are related to waxwings and most species have small crests.

 Phainopepla, Phainopepla nitens (S)

Old World sparrows
Order: PasseriformesFamily: Passeridae

Old World sparrows are small passerine birds. In general, sparrows tend to be small plump brownish or greyish birds with short tails and short powerful beaks. Sparrows are seed-eaters, but they also consume small insects.

House sparrow, Passer domesticus (I)
Eurasian tree sparrow, Passer montanus (I) (H)

Wagtails and pipits
Order: PasseriformesFamily: Motacillidae

Motacillidae is a family of small passerine birds with medium to long tails. They include the wagtails, longclaws, and pipits. They are slender ground-feeding insectivores of open country.

American pipit, Anthus rubescens
Sprague's pipit, Anthus spragueii

Finches, euphonias, and allies
Order: PasseriformesFamily: Fringillidae

Finches are small to moderately large seed-eating passerine birds with a strong beak, usually conical and in some species very large. All have 12 tail feathers and nine primaries flight feathers. Finches have a bouncing flight, alternating bouts of flapping with gliding on closed wings, and most sing well.

Brambling, Fringilla montifringilla (S)
Evening grosbeak, Coccothraustes vespertinus
Pine grosbeak, Pinicola enucleator
Grey-crowned rosy-finch, Leucosticte tephrocotis
Black rosy-finch, Leucosticte atrata (H)
House finch, Haemorhous mexicanus (I) (Native to the southwestern U.S.)
Purple finch, Haemorhous purpureus
Cassin's finch, Haemorhous cassinii (S)
Common redpoll, Acanthis flammea
Hoary redpoll, Acanthis hornemanni
Red crossbill, Loxia curvirostra
White-winged crossbill, Loxia leucoptera
Pine siskin, Spinus pinus
Lesser goldfinch, Spinus psaltria (S)
American goldfinch, Spinus tristis

Longspurs and snow buntings
Order: PasseriformesFamily: Calcariidae

The Calcariidae are a group of passerine birds that were traditionally grouped with the New World sparrows, but differ in a number of respects and are usually found in open grassy areas.

Thick-billed longspur, Rhynchophanes mccownii
Lapland longspur, Calcarius lapponicus
Smith's longspur, Calcarius pictus
Chestnut-collared longspur, Calcarius ornatus
Snow bunting, Plectrophenax nivalis

Old World buntings
Order: PasseriformesFamily: Emberizidae

Emberizidae is a family of passerine birds containing a single genus. Until 2017, the New World sparrows (Passerellidae) were also considered part of this family.

Rustic bunting, Emberiza rustica (S)

New World sparrows
Order: PasseriformesFamily: Passerellidae

Until 2017, these species were considered part of the family Emberizidae. Most of the species are known as sparrows, but these birds are not closely related to the Old World sparrows which are in the family Passeridae. Many of these have distinctive head patterns.

Grasshopper sparrow, Ammodramus savannarum
Black-throated sparrow, Amphispiza bilineata (S)
Lark sparrow, Chondestes grammacus
Lark bunting, Calamospiza melanocorys
Chipping sparrow, Spizella passerina
Clay-coloured sparrow, Spizella pallida
Field sparrow, Spizella pusilla
Brewer's sparrow, Spizella breweri
Fox sparrow, Passerella iliaca
American tree sparrow, Spizelloides arborea
Dark-eyed junco, Junco hyemalis
White-crowned sparrow, Zonotrichia leucophrys
Golden-crowned sparrow, Zonotrichia atricapilla (S)
Harris's sparrow, Zonotrichia querula
White-throated sparrow, Zonotrichia albicollis
Sagebrush sparrow, Artemisiospiza nevadensis (H)
Vesper sparrow, Pooecetes gramineus
LeConte's sparrow, Ammospiza leconteii
Nelson's sparrow, Ammospiza nelsoni
Baird's sparrow, Centronyx bairdii (A)
Savannah sparrow, Passerculus sandwichensis
Song sparrow, Melospiza melodia
Lincoln's sparrow, Melospiza lincolnii
Swamp sparrow, Melospiza georgiana
Green-tailed towhee, Pipilo chlorurus (S)
Spotted towhee, Pipilo maculatus
Eastern towhee, Pipilo erythrophthalmus

Yellow-breasted chat
Order: PasseriformesFamily: Icteriidae

This species was historically placed in the wood-warblers (Parulidae) but nonetheless most authorities were unsure if it belonged there. It was placed in its own family in 2017.

Yellow-breasted chat, Icteria virens

Troupials and allies
Order: PasseriformesFamily: Icteridae

The icterids are a group of small to medium-sized, often colourful passerine birds restricted to the New World and include the blackbirds, meadowlarks, cowbirds, grackles, and New World orioles. Most species have black as a predominant plumage colour, often enlivened by yellow, orange, or red.

Yellow-headed blackbird, Xanthocephalus xanthocephalus
Bobolink, Dolichonyx oryzivorus
Eastern meadowlark, Sturnella magna (S)
Western meadowlark, Sturnella neglecta
Orchard oriole, Icterus spurius
Bullock's oriole, Icterus bullockii (S)
Baltimore oriole, Icterus galbula
Red-winged blackbird, Agelaius phoeniceus
Brown-headed cowbird, Molothrus ater
Rusty blackbird, Euphagus carolinus
Brewer's blackbird, Euphagus cyanocephalus
Common grackle, Quiscalus quiscula
Great-tailed grackle, Quiscalus mexicanus (H)

New world warblers
Order: PasseriformesFamily: Parulidae

The wood-warblers are a group of small often colourful passerine birds restricted to the New World. Most are arboreal, but some are more terrestrial. Most members of this family are insectivores.

Ovenbird, Seiurus aurocapilla
Worm-eating warbler, Helmitheros vermivorum (S)
Northern waterthrush, Parkesia noveboracensis
Golden-winged warbler, Vermivora chrysoptera (S)
Blue-winged warbler, Vermivora cyanoptera (S)
Black-and-white warbler, Mniotilta varia
Prothonotary warbler, Protonotaria citrea (S)
Tennessee warbler, Leiothlypis peregrina
Orange-crowned warbler, Leiothlypis celata
Nashville warbler, Leiothlypis ruficapilla
Connecticut warbler, Oporornis agilis
MacGillivray's warbler, Geothlypis tolmiei
Mourning warbler, Geothlypis philadelphia
Kentucky warbler, Geothlypis formosa (H)
Common yellowthroat, Geothlypis trichas
Hooded warbler, Setophaga citrina (S)
American redstart, Setophaga ruticilla
Cape May warbler, Setophaga tigrina
Northern parula, Setophaga americana (S)
Magnolia warbler, Setophaga magnolia
Bay-breasted warbler, Setophaga castanea
Blackburnian warbler, Setophaga fusca
Yellow warbler, Setophaga petechia
Chestnut-sided warbler, Setophaga pensylvanica
Blackpoll warbler, Setophaga striata
Black-throated blue warbler, Setophaga caerulescens
Palm warbler, Setophaga palmarum
Pine warbler, Setophaga pinus (S)
Yellow-rumped warbler, Setophaga coronata
Yellow-throated warbler, Setophaga dominica (S)
Prairie warbler, Setophaga discolor (S)
Black-throated grey warbler, Setophaga nigrescens (S)
Townsend's warbler, Setophaga townsendi (S)
Black-throated green warbler, Setophaga virens
Canada warbler, Cardellina canadensis
Wilson's warbler, Cardellina pusilla

Cardinals and allies
Order: PasseriformesFamily: Cardinalidae

Cardinals and grosbeaks are a family of robust, seed-eating birds with strong bills. They are typically associated with open woodland. The sexes usually have distinct plumages.

Hepatic tanager, Piranga flava (S)
Summer tanager, Piranga rubra (S)
Scarlet tanager, Piranga olivacea
Western tanager, Piranga ludoviciana
Northern cardinal, Cardinalis cardinalis
Rose-breasted grosbeak, Pheucticus ludovicianus
Black-headed grosbeak, Pheucticus melanocephalus
Blue grosbeak, Passerina caerulea (S)
Lazuli bunting, Passerina amoena
Indigo bunting, Passerina cyanea
Painted bunting, Passerina ciris (S)
Dickcissel, Spiza americana

Notes

References

See also
List of birds
Lists of birds by region
List of birds of Canada

birds
Saskatchewan
Birds